Dancy may refer to:

People with the surname
 Bill Dancy (born 1951), American baseball coach
 Chanda Dancy (born 1978), American film composer, violinist, keyboardist, and singer
 Deborah Dancy (born 1949), American painter, printmaker and mixed media artist
 Hugh Dancy (born 1975), English actor
 Jake Dancy (born 1978), American soccer defender
 John C. Dancy (1857–1920), American politician, journalist, and educator
 John Dancy (1920–2019), English headmaster
 Jonathan Dancy (born 1946), British philosopher
 Keith Dancy (1929–2001), Canadian hockey announcer
 Mira Dancy (born 1979), American painter
 Paul Dancy (born 1978), English cricketer
 Vincent Dancy, American football coach

Places

France
 Dancy, Eure-et-Loir, commune in the Eure-et-Loir department

United States
 Dancy, Wisconsin, unincorporated community

Other uses
 Dancy (citrus), a citrus cultivar of the tangerine/mandarin type